"Everyday & Everynight" is the title of a top five dance single by Yvette Michele. According to Billboard, the single is considered "a club classic".

Chart positions

References

1996 singles
1996 songs
RCA Records singles
Yvette Michele songs